is a novel by Renzaburō Shibata. The protagonist of this jidaigeki is Matsudaira Zankurō, a low-ranking gokenin in the service of the Tokugawa shogunate. He lives with his mother Masajo in the shogunal capital of Edo. Other characters include his fiancée Matsudaira Sumi, old friend Nishio Denzaburō, and favorite geisha Otsuta.

From 1995 to 2002 Gokenin Zankurō was also a prime-time television series on the Fuji Television network in Japan. Ken Watanabe played the lead, with Kyōko Kishida as his mother and Mayumi Wakamura as the geisha (Tsutakichi in the series). Watanabe directed the final episode.

References

External links
  Fuji Television site

Jidaigeki television series
Fuji TV dramas
1995 Japanese television series debuts
2002 Japanese television series endings
Television shows based on Japanese novels
Japanese novels
Year of work missing